The American Idol Experience was a theme park attraction at Disney's Hollywood Studios at the Walt Disney World Resort.  Inspired by the popular American television series American Idol, the attraction invited park guests to audition in front of live audiences who would vote for their favorite singers.

History
The attraction's grand opening took place on February 14, 2009, with occasional preview performances in the weeks leading up to the official opening. A press event just prior to the official opening featured many "Idol" celebrities, including all seven winners, numerous finalists, host Ryan Seacrest, judge Paula Abdul and "American Idol" creator Simon Fuller.

The American Idol Experience was promoted by winners of the American Idol from Season seven onwards by appearing in commercials and announcing "I'm going to Disney World!".

In June 2014, Disney announced that the show would close in January 2015, then two months later they pushed forward the closure to the end of August 2014.

Operations

Finale show and "Dream Ticket"
The last show of each operating day featured the winners of that day's preliminary shows. Again, the live audience voted for the performer they liked the best. During the show, the audience was prompted to encourage the contestants and heckle the judges.

Winners
Fourteenth season semi-finalist Adam Ezegelian was a two-time Dream Ticket winner (2009 and 2014).

References

External links
 

2009 establishments in Florida
2014 disestablishments in Florida
Experience
Disney's Hollywood Studios
Echo Lake (Disney)
former Walt Disney Parks and Resorts attractions